Dermapteromyces is a genus of fungi in the family Laboulbeniaceae. The genus contain three species.

References

External links
Dermapteromyces at Index Fungorum

Laboulbeniomycetes